The Volvo 8700 was a single-decker city and single-decker intercity bus manufactured by Volvo between 2002 and 2011. It was available both with medium floor and as the low-entry Volvo 8700LE, which was even built as the articulated Volvo 8700LEA on a B12BLEA chassis. It was also available as a coach, and even some were delivered with a toilet.

As a successor to the Carrus Vega, which was also built and sold as Volvo B10-400 and Volvo 7250 in Germany and Poland, the main difference was that it was built on the Volvo TX platform. The exterior was just as a simple facelift from the old model. The medium floor 8700 was available on B7R, B12B and B12M chassis, with all except the B7R available as a tri-axle bus. The 8700LE was available on B7RLE and B12BLE, with only the B12BLE as a tri-axle bus.

In 2011 it was succeeded by the 8900.

In Norway a total of 1300 buses were delivered, with the 8700 and 8700LE having an almost equal share.

References

External links

Vehicles introduced in 2002
8700
Low-entry buses
Tri-axle buses
Articulated buses
Coaches (bus)